Viscount Mersey, of Toxteth in the County Palatine of Lancaster, is a title in the Peerage of the United Kingdom. It was created in 1916 for the lawyer and politician John Bigham, 1st Baron Mersey. He had already been created Baron Mersey, of Toxteth in the County Palatine of Lancaster, in 1910, also in the Peerage of the United Kingdom. His son, the second Viscount, was a Deputy Speaker of the House of Lords and also served as Liberal Chief Whip in the House of Lords from 1944 to 1949. His son, the third Viscount, married Katherine Petty-Fitzmaurice, 12th Lady Nairne, the eldest daughter of Henry Petty-Fitzmaurice, 6th Marquess of Lansdowne and 10th Lord Nairne. They were both succeeded by their son, the fourth Viscount Mersey and thirteenth Lord Nairne.  the titles are held by the latter's son, the fifth Viscount, who succeeded in 2006.

The family seat is Bignor Park, near Pulborough, Sussex.

Viscounts Mersey (1916)
John Charles Bigham, 1st Viscount Mersey (1840–1929)
Charles Clive Bigham, 2nd Viscount Mersey (1872–1956)
Edward Clive Bigham, 3rd Viscount Mersey (1906–1979)
Richard Maurice Clive Bigham, 4th Viscount Mersey (1934–2006)
Edward John Hallam Bigham, 5th Viscount Mersey (b. 1966)

The heir presumptive is the present holder's uncle Hon. David Edward Hugh Bigham (b. 1938).
The heir presumptive's heir apparent is his son Charles Richard Petty Bigham (b. 1967).
The heir presumptive's heir apparent's heir apparent is his elder son Caspar Patrick Ronan Bigham (b. 1997)

Works

See also
Lord Nairne

Notes

References
Kidd, Charles, Williamson, David (editors). Debrett's Peerage and Baronetage (1990 edition). New York: St Martin's Press, 1990,

External links

The Mersey Manuscripts are held at the Parliamentary Archives

Viscountcies in the Peerage of the United Kingdom
Noble titles created in 1916
Noble titles created for UK MPs